Hergenröther is a German surname. Notable people with the surname include:

Carl W. Hergenrother, American astronomer
168P/Hergenrother, a periodic comet in the Solar System
3099 Hergenrother, main-belt asteroid
Joseph Hergenröther (1824–1890), German Church historian and canonist

See also
Hergenroth

German-language surnames